Emerald is a distributed, object-oriented programming language developed in the 1980s by Andrew P. Black, Norman C. Hutchinson, Eric B. Jul, and Henry M. Levy, in the Department of Computer Science at the University of Washington.

A simple Emerald program can create an object and move it around the system:

 const Kilroy ←  object Kilroy
   process
   const origin ←  locate self
   const up ← origin.getActiveNodes
   for e in up
    const there ← e.getTheNode
    move self to there
   end for
   move self to origin
   end process
 end Kilroy

Emerald was designed to support high performance distribution, location, and high performance of objects, to simplify distributed programming, to exploit information hiding, and to be a small language.

References

External links
 
 
 Emerald project on Sourcefourge, including Eclipse plugin

Object-oriented programming languages